Jesse Hoyt (June 28, 1792 – March 17, 1867) was an American lawyer and politician from New York.

Early life
Hoyt was born in New Canaan, Fairfield County, Connecticut on June 28, 1792.  He was the second son and third born of nine total children of Goold Hoyt, a merchant and broker, and Sarah (née Reid) Hoyt.

His paternal grandparents were Justus Hoyt, a shoemaker and farmer  who served one campaign in the French and Indian War, and Elizabeth Hoyt and his maternal grandfather was Timothy Reed.

Career
He moved to Albany, New York, and became a merchant but failed. Then, he studied law with Martin Van Buren, was admitted to the bar in 1819, and commenced practice in partnership with Van Buren and Benjamin F. Butler in Hudson, New York. Soon after, Hoyt removed to New York City, and continued the practice of law there, specializing in Chancery cases.

He was a member from New York County of the New York State Assembly in 1823.  Hoyt was part of the Bucktails faction of the Democratic-Republican Party.

In 1838, Hoyt was appointed by President Van Buren as Collector of the Port of New York to replace Samuel Swartwout who had been Collector since 1829. Soon after Hoyt's taking office, Swartwout was accused of embezzlement, but in February 1841, Van Buren was forced to remove Hoyt by appointing John J. Morgan as Collector, after Hoyt had also been accused of embezzlement. The episode became known as the Swartwout-Hoyt scandal. Afterwards, Hoyt resumed the practice of law.

Personal life
On April 3, 1828, he married Cornelia Emeline Thurston (1803–1852). She was the daughter of Robert Jenkins Thurston and Abigail (née Bogert) Thurston. Together, they were the parents of six children:

 Cornelia Thurston Hoyt (1829–1888).
 Louis Thurston Hoyt (1834–1901), who married Marie Antoinette Bogert (1839–1879). After her death, he married Frances Mary Jones (1839–1930).
 William Henry Hoyt.
 Emily Adele Hoyt (1838–1889), who married Francis Adams De Wint (1834–1866).
 Robert Sands Hoyt (1840–1879).
 Ella Carroll Hoyt, who married J. de Wint Whittemore.

Hoyt died in New York City on March 17, 1867.

References
Notes

Sources

External links

1792 births
1867 deaths
New York (state) Jacksonians
19th-century American politicians
New York (state) Democratic-Republicans
Collectors of the Port of New York
Members of the New York State Assembly
Politicians from New York City
People from Hudson, New York
People from New Canaan, Connecticut
Lawyers from New York City